Mikhail Nikolov Abadzhiev (born 5 November 1935) is a Bulgarian weightlifter. He competed in the 1960 Summer Olympics.

References

1935 births
Living people
Weightlifters at the 1960 Summer Olympics
Bulgarian male weightlifters
Olympic weightlifters of Bulgaria